The Old Town of Edinburgh, Scotland, consisted originally of the main street, now known as the Royal Mile, and the small alleyways and courtyards that led off it to the north and south. These were usually named after a memorable occupant of one of the apartments reached by the common entrance, or a trade plied by one or more residents. Generically such an alleyway is termed a close , a Scots term for alleyway, although it may be individually named close, entry, court, or wynd. A close is private property, hence gated and closed to the public, whereas a wynd is an open thoroughfare, usually wide enough for a horse and cart . Most slope steeply down from the Royal Mile creating the impression of a herring-bone pattern formed by the main street and side streets when viewed on a map. Many have steps and long flights of stairs.

Because of the need for security within its town walls against English attacks in past wars, Edinburgh experienced a pronounced density in housing. Closes tend to be narrow with tall buildings on both sides, giving them a canyon-like appearance and atmosphere.

The Royal Mile comprises five linear, conjoined streets: Castle Hill; Lawnmarket; High Street; Canongate and Abbey Strand. Closes are listed below from west to east, divided between the south and north sides of the street.

This list names closes currently in existence. Since the Council encourages recreation of closes in new developments the list is not static. New buildings traditionally incorporate the name of the close that historically existed on the same site.

Castlehill

Castlehill forms the western end of the Royal Mile, running from the Castle Esplanade to the junction of Johnston Terrace.

South
Castle Wynd (in two sections, North and South). This connects Castlehill with the Grassmarket via Johnston Terrace. With buildings on only one side, it is not typical of most closes.
Old Distillery Close (private / dead end)
Boswell's Court (named after an uncle of Dr. Johnson's biographer, James Boswell) (private / dead end)

North
Skinner's Close (sign only/ no route remains)
Semple's Close (sealed/ private dead end)
Jollie's Close (sealed/ private dead end)

Lawnmarket

The Lawnmarket is the section between Johnstone Terrace and George IV Bridge/Bank Street.

South
Riddle's Court (dead end)
Fisher's Close (public connection to Victoria Terrace)
Brodie's Close, named after the family home of Deacon Brodie (dog-leg leading onto Fisher's Close)
Buchanan's Close (dog-leg leading onto Fisher's Close)

North
Mylne's Court, built by Robert Mylne
James Court (signed as West Entry, Mid Entry, East Entry)
Lady Stair's Close
Wardrop's Close

High Street

The High Street runs from St Giles Street to St Mary's Street, the location of the Netherbow Port, and the limit of the pre-19th century burgh of Edinburgh.

South
Barrie's Close (dog-leg connecting Parliament Sq. to Old Fishmarket Close)
Old Fishmarket Close (public connection to the Cowgate/open to vehicles)
Borthwick's Close (leading to Tron Square)
Old Assembly Close, location of the original assembly rooms
Covenant Close (dead end)
Burnet's Close (dead end)
Bell's Wynd (leading to Tron Square)
New Assembly Close, location of the later assembly rooms
Stevenlaw's Close (connecting to Cowgate)
Marlin's Wynd (partially preserved and on view under the Tron Kirk), named after the Merlioun family
Dickson's Close (sign only, erected 1990)
Cant's Close (sign only, erected 1990)
Melrose Close (sign only, erected 1990), named for Andrew Durie, Abbot of Melrose Abbey.
Toddrick's Wynd (sealed/private)
South Gray's Close (connecting to Cowgate/ vehicle access from Cowgate)
Hyndford's Close (links to South Gray's Close)
Fountain Close (links to South Gray's Close)
Tweeddale Court, named after the Marquess of Tweeddale. Home to several publishing houses over the centuries including Oliver & Boyd, The List, Moubray House Publishing and Canongate Books
World's End Close (last close before reaching the former site of the town wall)

North
Byer's Close (private/ dead end)
Advocates Close (connecting to Cockburn Street)
Roxburgh Close (upper section accessible/ lower section private and blocked)
Writer's Close leading to Warriston Close (connecting to Cockburn Street)
Mary King's Close
Craig's Close (accessed only from Cockburn Street, connecting to Market Street).
Anchor Close (connecting to Cockburn street)
Geddes Entry (private/ dead end)
North Foulis Close (private/ dead end)
Old Stamp Office Close (private/ dead end)
Lyon's Close (private/ dead end)
Jackson's Close (connecting to Cockburn Street)
Fleshmarket Close (connecting to Market Street via Cockburn Street)
Carrubber's Close (connecting to Jeffrey Street)
Bishop's Close (sealed/private dead-end)
North Gray's Close (connecting to Jeffrey Street)
Morrison's Close (sealed/ private dead end)
Bailie Fyfe's Close (dead end)
Paisley Close (dead end)
Chalmers' Close (connecting to Jeffrey Street)
Monteith's Close (private/ dead end)(sign on ground only)
Trunk's Close (accessible but private/ dead end)
Baron Maule's Close (private, leads to private garden)

Canongate

The Canongate is the section from St Mary's Street to the foot of the Royal Mile, and connects to Abbey Strand at Holyrood, which ran through the former Burgh of Canongate.

South
Gullan's Close (connecting to Holyrood Road)
Gibb's Close (sign only/ serves solely as access to a shop)
Pirrie's Close (connecting to Chessel's Court)
Old Playhouse Close (sealed/ private dead end)
Sugarhouse Close
Bakehouse Close
Wilson's Court
Cooper's Close
Crichton's Close
Bull's Close (connecting to Holyrood Road)
Reid's Close (currently no sign/ connects to Holyrood Road))
Vallence's Entry (no sign/ private dead end)

North
Midcommon Close (sealed/ private dead end)
Bowling Green Close (leading to Gladstone's Court)
Big Jack's Close (pedestrian access to Sibbald Walk)
Old Tolbooth Wynd (vehicle access from Calton Road)
Dunbar's Close (leading to a knot garden)
Panmure Close (partly sealed over newly built extension)
Brown's Court (dead end)
Lochend Close (vehicular access from Calton Road)
Gladstone's Court (private/ dead end)
Reid's Court (the old Canongate manse)
Campbell's Close (cranked connection to Calton Road)
Brown's Close (dead end)
Forsyth's Close (sealed/ private dead end)
Galloway's Entry (dead end)
White Horse Close (site of a coaching inn; extensively restored)

References

 
Closes
Closes on the Royal Mile
Closes